Phi Beta Fraternity: National Professional Association for the Creative and Performing Arts is an American national professional college fraternity for the creative and performing arts. It was founded in 1912 at Northwestern University in Evanston, Illinois. Phi Beta is gender inclusive and incorporates all art forms into its membership.

Origins 
Phi Beta Fraternity began as a local club at Northwestern University in Evanston, IL on May 5, 1912. Its three founders were:
 Josephine Mack
 Elsie Schultz
 Gladys Burnside

Founders' vision 
The Founders began with a local vision of uniting arts, evidenced by the selection of some its first members: from the School of Music came Mae Aurelius and Clara Ayers and from the School of Oratory came Rosebud Fortier, Gertrude Thomas and Evelyn Owens.

In the beginning, the fraternity limited its membership to women majoring in music and speech. Over time, the fraternity has grown to embrace all of the creative and performing arts and their related therapies and histories, marking this broader acceptance of arts students instead of only fine arts, or only dance.

Milestones
In the fall of 1914 the fraternity was incorporated in the State of Illinois.

Phi Beta organized its first residence, renting a house at 1928 Sherman Avenue in Evanston, Illinois.

Susan B. Davis, an admired member of the Northwestern faculty, was chosen as the first honorary member of Phi Beta.

Grace Mattern, who penned many of Phi Beta's rituals and ceremonies, was initiated in 1914 upon her return to Evanston to pursue her master's degree and join the faculty at Northwestern's School of Speech.

A juncture was reached in 1915 when the Alpha chapter of Phi Beta, still a young local group, petitioned the women's social fraternity Alpha Delta Pi for a charter. But because most of Phi Beta's members were enrolled in professional two- or three- year coursework, as opposed to traditional four-year programs, that petition was denied.

Yet the founders' vision of an organization that would promote the arts through service appealed to others. Also in 1915, a group of women at the Chicago Conservatory had petitioned to become a chapter of Phi Beta Fraternity.

Helen Rowan served as Phi Beta's first national president.

Phi Beta's first Convention was held in the spring of 1918 in Chicago, IL.

Now on its way to expand as a new national fraternity, Phi Beta would remain a professional organization, embracing the arts-centric vision of its founding members as it sought expansion.

In 1974 and 1975 its chapters voted to become co-ed, prompted by Title IX. Phi Beta today is gender inclusive.

National projects 
Phi Beta has completed several national projects including: enlarging by hand sheet music for the visually impaired, service in USO shows, aiding music programs in Mexico, and most notably its continued work with The MacDowell (artists' residency and workshop) in Peterborough, New Hampshire.

Symbolism 
The colors of Phi Beta are violet and gold.

The official flower of Phi Beta is the Yellow Rose, tied by a violet ribbon. Symbolically the rose and ribbon reflect the fraternity's official colors, but are also intended to represent "joy, friendship, and new beginnings."

Affiliations 
Phi Beta is affiliated with the Fraternity Communication Association (FCA), the Professional Fraternity Association (PFA) and the National Interfraternity Music Council (NIMC)

See also

 Professional fraternities and sororities

References

Professional fraternities and sororities in the United States
National Interfraternity Music Council
Student organizations established in 1912
Music organizations based in the United States
Professional Fraternity Association
1921 establishments in Illinois